The Collegio del Cambio frescos are a series of allegorical fresco paintings in the Audience Chamber (Sala delle Udienze) of the Collegio del Cambio in Perugia, painted by Perugino.

History
In 1452 the Arte del Cambio was authorised to set up a headquarters near the fringes of the palazzo dei Priori. They built the building between 1452 and 1457. In 1496 they decided to commission Perugino to decorate the building's Audience Chamber. He was then the among the most in-demand artists in Italy, leading studios in both Florence and Perugia. 

They signed the contract with the painter on 26 January 1496, though he mainly worked on the cycle in 1498, finishing it in 1500. His assistants on the project included Andrea d'Assisi and probably the young Raphael for the figure of Strength and the face of Solomon. He was paid 350 gold ducats on 11 June 1507. Vasari praised it in his Lives of the Artists:

List

Ceiling

Nativity

Transfiguration

God the Father

Prudence and Justice with six ancient figures

Strength and Temperance with six ancient heroes

Self-portrait

External links
 Page about the Collegio del Cambio
 Page on the frescos and their allegorical meanings
 Article

Fresco paintings in Umbria
Paintings by Pietro Perugino
1500 paintings